Stade Municipal de Kintélé or Stade municipal de Kintélé in Brazzaville is the national stadium of the Republic of the Congo. It is used for football matches and also has an athletics track. It hosts the home games of Congo national football team. It holds 60,000 people. and opened with a football match between Congo and Ghana. It served as the main venue for the 2015 All-Africa Games.

References  

Football venues in the Republic of the Congo
Athletics (track and field) venues in the Republic of the Congo
Sports venues in the Republic of the Congo
Congo, Republic of
Stadiums of the African Games
Buildings and structures in Brazzaville
Sports venues completed in 2015
2015 establishments in the Republic of the Congo
Sport in Brazzaville